Jimmy McNeil was a Scottish rugby union player. He became the 103rd President of the Scottish Rugby Union.

Rugby Union career

Amateur career

He played for Hutchesons' GSFP.

Provincial career

He played for Glasgow District.

Administrative career

McNeil was a President of Hutchesons' GSFP. His declared neutrality on the proposed merger with Old Aloysians allowed the clubs to merge to become Hutchesons Aloysians in 1990.

He was a Chairman of Glasgow District.

He became the 103rd President of the Scottish Rugby Union. He served the standard one year from 1989 to 1990.

He caused controversy when he and the Vice-President Gordon Masson attended the 1989 centenary celebrations of South African rugby.

McNeil also made the headlines by calling out derogatory language among rugby union fans. He said that some fans were using 'degrading and foul language' and that there was a 'changing climate' in which matches were being played.

He was President when Scotland won a Grand Slam in 1990. In The Grudge Tom English relays an anecdote when Scotland beat Ireland in Dublin en route to securing the title. McNeil went in to the victorious Scotland dressing room after the match - evidently not paying attention to the match as he had been at the bar - and said: 'Bad luck men. You'll get them next time'.

He went on the 1990 tour to New Zealand.

References

2003 deaths
Scottish rugby union players
Presidents of the Scottish Rugby Union
Hutchesons' GSFP players
Glasgow District (rugby union) players